Harvey is a 1950 American comedy-drama film based on Mary Chase's 1944 play of the same name, directed by Henry Koster, and starring James Stewart and Josephine Hull.

Plot
Elwood P. Dowd is an amiable but eccentric man whose best friend is an invisible,  white rabbit named Harvey. As described by Elwood, Harvey is a pooka, a benign but mischievous creature from Celtic mythology. Elwood spends most of his time taking Harvey around town, drinking at various bars and introducing Harvey to almost every person he meets, much to the puzzlement of strangers, though Elwood's friends have accepted Harvey's (supposed) existence. His older sister Veta and his niece Myrtle Mae live with him in his large estate, but have become social outcasts along with Elwood due to his obsession with Harvey.

After Elwood ruins a party Veta and Myrtle Mae had arranged in secret, Veta finally tries to have him committed to a local sanatorium. In exasperation she admits to the attending psychiatrist, Dr. Lyman Sanderson, that she sees Harvey every once in a while herself. Mistaking Veta as the real mental case, Sanderson has Elwood released and Veta locked up. Dr. Chumley, head of the sanatorium, discovers the mistake and realizes he must bring Elwood back, searching the town with orderly Marvin Wilson. With Veta's help, Chumley eventually tracks Elwood to his favorite bar, "Charlie's", and decides to confront him alone.

Four hours later, Marvin returns to the sanatorium, but learns from Sanderson and nurse Kelly that Chumley has not returned with Elwood. They arrive at Charlie's and find Elwood alone; he explains that Chumley had wandered off with Harvey after several rounds of drinks. When asked, Elwood explains that he met Harvey one night several years ago after escorting a drunk friend to a taxi, and they had since enjoyed going to bars and socializing with other patrons to hear their grand life stories and aspirations. Convinced Elwood is insane and may have harmed Chumley, Marvin calls the police and has Elwood escorted back to the sanatorium.

Chumley returns to the sanatorium disheveled and paranoid, and is followed by an invisible presence. When the others arrive, Chumley invites Elwood to his office. In private, Chumley says that he now knows Harvey is real, and Elwood explains Harvey's various powers, including his ability to stop time, send anyone to any destination for as long as they like, and then bring them back without a minute passing. Chumley expresses his fantasy to go to Akron with a beautiful woman for two weeks. Veta arrives with Judge Gaffney and Myrtle Mae, prepared to commit Elwood, but are convinced by Sanderson that an injection of a serum called "Formula 977" will stop Elwood from "seeing the rabbit".

As they prepare the injection, Veta tries to pay the cab driver but, emptying her purse, is unable to find her smaller coin purse. She interrupts the injection procedure and asks Elwood to pay the driver. Warmed by Elwood's kindness, the cab driver explains how he has driven many people to the sanatorium to receive the same medicine, warning Veta that Elwood will soon become "a perfectly normal human being, and you know what stinkers they are." Veta is upset by this, and halts the injection; she then finds her coin purse, and realizes that Harvey had intervened to save her brother.

Leaving the institute, Elwood sees Harvey on the porch swing. Harvey tells him that he's decided to stay and take Chumley on his fantasy trip to Akron. Elwood walks out the gates dejected, but after they close he sees Harvey coming back, and the gate switch is pulled open by an unseen force. Elwood happily says "I prefer you too, Harvey", and they follow Veta and Myrtle Mae into the sunrise.

Cast
 James Stewart as Elwood P. Dowd
 Josephine Hull as Veta Louise Dowd Simmons
 Peggy Dow as Miss Kelly
 Charles Drake as Dr. Lyman Sanderson
 Victoria Horne as Myrtle Mae Simmons
 Jesse White as Marvin Wilson, orderly
 Cecil Kellaway as Dr. William Chumley
 William H. Lynn as Judge Omar Gaffney
 Dick Wessel as Bartender Mr. Cracker
 Nana Bryant as Mrs. Hazel Chumley
 Grayce Mills as Aunt Ethel Chauvenet
 Clem Bevans as Herman Shimmelplatzer, gatekeeper
 Harry Hines as Mr. Meegles
 Norman Leavitt as Henry, first cab driver
 Wallace Ford as E.J. Lofgren, second cab driver
 Sam Wolfe as Minninger, Gaffney's law clerk
 "Harvey as Himself" (on-screen credit in the final shot of the film)
 Maudie Prickett as Elvira the cook (uncredited)

Reception
Reviews from critics were mostly positive. Bosley Crowther of The New York Times wrote that "so freely flowing is the screenplay which Mrs. Chase and Oscar Brodney have prepared, so vivid and droll is the direction which Henry Koster has given it and, particularly, so darling is the acting of James Stewart, Josephine Hull and all the rest that a virtually brand new experience is still in store for even those who saw the play." Variety wrote that the play "loses little of its whimsical comedy charm in the screen translation", and that Stewart "would seem the perfect casting for the character so well does he convey the idea that escape from life into a pleasant half-world existence has many points in its favor." Harrison's Reports wrote, "A brief synopsis cannot do justice to the humor in the story, much of it delightful and some of it hilarious. Stewart is excellent in the leading role; his casual ease and amiability, and the quiet manner in which he explains his relationship with 'Harvey,' are fascinating." Richard L. Coe of The Washington Post called it "one of the most beguiling comedies possible ... I'm certain you'll admire the able playing of Stewart and the marvelous out-of-this-world perplexity of the superb Mrs. Hull. Both are Academy Award performances."

John McCarten of The New Yorker called it "a movie that only a case-hardened wowser would fail to find beguiling. Even if you saw the play, I don't think your familiarity with the alcoholic hallucinations of Elwood P. Dowd, the hero, will diminish your enjoyment of the film, and though James Stewart, who plays Dowd in the picture, doesn't bring to his part all the battered authority of Frank Fay, the originator of the role, he nevertheless succeeds in making plausible the notion that Harvey, the rabbit, would accept him as a pal." The Monthly Film Bulletin was less positive, writing that "Harvey himself scarcely begins to exist for the audience until the last few minutes. In his absence, the humours that can be extracted from the more obvious aspects of lunacy or suspected lunacy are wrung rather dry."

TV Guide says James Stewart gave "one of his finest performances in this lighthearted film", and it currently has five out of five stars on their site. 

Stewart took a percentage of the profits. In 1953, William Goetz estimated that Stewart had earned $200,000 from the film which is equivalent to $2.1 million today.

Home video release
In March 1990, James Stewart recorded a special narrative introduction, that would be combined with many of the film's still photos, which would be added to the film's original release on VHS. MCA Home Video released Harvey on VHS in 1990. This also appears on at least one DVD release of the film.

Awards and honors 

James Stewart later declared in an interview that Josephine Hull had the most difficult role in the film, since she had to believe and not believe in the invisible rabbit... at the same time.

The film is recognized by American Film Institute in these lists:
 2000: AFI's 100 Years...100 Laughs – #35
 2005: AFI's 100 Years...100 Movie Quotes:
 Elwood P. Dowd: "Well, I've wrestled with reality for thirty five years, Doctor, and I’m happy to state I finally won out over it." – Nominated
 2008: AFI's 10 Top 10:
 #7 Fantasy Film

In popular culture

Remakes
The play/film was made for television several times:
 1958, in a version starring Art Carney as Elwood, and Marion Lorne, Larry Blyden, Elizabeth Montgomery, Fred Gwynne, Charlotte Rae, and Jack Weston.
 1970, in a version for West German television called Mein Freund Harvey, with Heinz Rühmann as Elwood.
 1972, in a version also starring James Stewart and featuring Helen Hayes as his sister Veta, Jesse White reprising his role as Duane Wilson and Fred Gwynne.
 1985, in a version for West German television, with Harald Juhnke as Elwood and Elisabeth Wiedemann as Veta.
 1996, starring Harry Anderson and Swoosie Kurtz in the Elwood and Veta roles along with Leslie Nielsen and William Schallert.

Producer Don Gregory purchased the merchandising and film rights to Harvey from the Mary Chase estate in 1996. In April 1999, Gregory sold the rights to Miramax Films, who beat out several high-profile bidders, including Walt Disney Pictures (represented by the producing team Barry Sonnenfeld and Barry Josephson), Universal Pictures and New Line Cinema. However, Miramax still intended to have Gregory produce Harvey. Universal was interested in having Harvey with Jim Carrey starring and Tom Shadyac directing, while New Line saw it as an Adam Sandler movie. Harvey Weinstein of Miramax was also considering Carrey and Sandler, as well as Tom Hanks. Weinstein wanted Harvey to be set in a modern setting. Weinstein eventually took the project to Dimension Films, who partnered with Metro-Goldwyn-Mayer to co-finance. Craig Mazin was hired by Dimension in November 2001 to adapt the screenplay. John Travolta entered negotiations to star in March 2003, but the rights for Dimension and MGM lapsed, which were picked up by 20th Century Fox in 2008. Jonathan Tropper was hired to write the script, which, in August 2009, drew interest from Steven Spielberg as director. As a result, Spielberg pushed back development for an Abraham Lincoln biopic (which was released in 2012); a remake of Oldboy and an adaptation of The 39 Clues. It was then announced that Harvey would be a joint 50/50 production between 20th Century Fox and Spielberg's DreamWorks, with Spielberg and Gregory also set to produce the film. Tom Hanks, who previously worked with Spielberg on Saving Private Ryan, Catch Me If You Can and The Terminal, was considered for the lead role. Spielberg had also approached Robert Downey Jr., but in December 2009 Spielberg opted out after a dispute over his vision for the project.

In December 2018, it was reported that streaming service Netflix had started developing a version of Harvey.

Allusions
The Jimmy Stewart Museum, based in Stewart's hometown of Indiana, Pennsylvania, presents the Harvey Award to a distinguished celebrity tied to Stewart's spirit of humanitarianism. Past recipients include Robert Wagner, Shirley Jones, Janet Leigh, and Rich Little.

A 1971 children's film, Mr. Horatio Knibbles, also starred a giant talking rabbit, visible only to one person.

The first episode of the 1975 television series The Invisible Man featured a scene with an invisible rabbit (wearing a visible collar) called "Harvey", in a cage in a laboratory.

The 1977 comic book story, "The Harvey Pekar Name Story," written by Harvey Pekar and illustrated by Robert Crumb, alludes to the play/film when Pekar describes how childhood acquaintances made fun of his name by calling him "Harvey the Rabbit."

A scene in the 1988 film Who Framed Roger Rabbit has a barfly confessing to Judge Doom, "I seen the rabbit" (seemingly referring to Roger, who is being wrongfully sought as a murder suspect). He puts his arm around an invisible presence and says, "Well say hello – Harvey!", as a means of both mocking Doom and protecting Roger. The movie takes place in 1947, while the play was released in 1944.

In the 1989 film Field of Dreams, farmer Ray Kinsella hears a voice in his cornfield that no one else can hear. His daughter, Karin, is later shown watching a scene from Harvey on TV.

The 1992 film Memoirs of an Invisible Man sees the recently-turned-invisible Nick Holloway, afraid to reveal his identity to a sinister government agent, answer "Harvey" when asked his name.

The character Andy Dufresne in The Shawshank Redemption, released in 1994, describes "Randall Stevens" – the fake person Dufresne created to launder money – as "a phantom, an apparition, second cousin to Harvey the rabbit."

In the Farscape television series, produced by The Jim Henson Company between 1999 and 2003, the main character Crichton was often "haunted" by visual-auditory hallucinations referred to as a neural-clone of his archenemy Scorpius, produced by an interactive neurochip embedded in his brain. This character is dubbed "Harvey" and called such by Crichton in direct reference to the original film.

In the 2000 film Sexy Beast, Ray Winstone's character sometimes sees a large imaginary rabbit.

In the 2001 movie A Beautiful Mind, John Nash points to an empty chair and says to his friend, "Have you met Harvey?"

The 2001 film Donnie Darko contains a six-foot tall rabbit named Frank, which haunts the titular character. Despite popular belief that this character was a reference to Harvey, Donnie Darko's writer/director Richard Kelly denies it. In an interview with Future Movies, he is quoted as saying: "I have never even seen the movie, it never occurred to me." In 2002, the Aero Theatre in Santa Monica programmed Harvey and Donnie Darko as a double feature.

In the series Scrubs, J.D.'s 'conscience' is his high school gym teacher in a bunny suit.

In 2004, the 15th-season episode of The Simpsons, "My Big Fat Geek Wedding" contained a similar imaginary rabbit acting as Barney's 'anti-sobriety' sponsor.

In the cartoon series Foster's Home for Imaginary Friends, the city's founder was Elwood P. Dowd.

In the  2008 video game Edna & Harvey: The Breakout, the titular protagonist has a stuffed rabbit named Harvey whom she imagines talks to her.

A British law firm was partially named after the rabbit.

In the 2015 episode "Adventures in Chinchilla-sitting" in the cartoon series Bob's Burgers, character Teddy seems to spot Louise's signature bunny ears. When he turns, the ears have disappeared and he remarks, "Thought I saw Harvey."

The British indie rock band Her's included a song named "Harvey" based on the film on their 2018 debut album Invitation to Her's. Harvey was one of lead singer Stephen Fitzpatrick's favorite films.

In 2019 the thirteenth episode of the podcast The Anthropocene Reviewed featured the film.

See also
The Unicorn in the Garden, a 1939 short story to which the film alludes.

References

External links

 Full film, Harvey at Internet Archive
 
 
 
 
 
 Transcript of a July 1997 memorial for Stewart from The NewsHour with Jim Lehrer, which includes scenes from and commentary on Harvey
Joe Dante on Harvey at Trailers from Hell
Voices of Oklahoma interview with Peggy Dow Helmerich. First person interview conducted with Peggy Dow Helmerich, actress in Harvey. Original audio and transcript archived with Voices of Oklahoma oral history project.

1950 films
1950s fantasy comedy-drama films
American fantasy comedy-drama films
American black-and-white films
1950s English-language films
American films based on plays
Films about rabbits and hares
Films set in psychiatric hospitals
Films set in Colorado
Films featuring a Best Supporting Actress Academy Award-winning performance
Films featuring a Best Supporting Actress Golden Globe-winning performance
Universal Pictures films
Films directed by Henry Koster
Films scored by Frank Skinner
1950s American films